Increase may refer to:

Increase (given name)
Increase (knitting), the creation of one or more new stitches
Increase, Mississippi, a former name of a community

See also
 Decline (disambiguation)